Georgia Odette Sallybanks (born 1997), who performs as Odette, is an English-born Australian singer-songwriter and musician. Her debut album, To a Stranger (July 2018), peaked at No. 13 on the ARIA Albums Chart. At the ARIA Music Awards of 2018 it was nominated for Best Adult Contemporary Album and Breakthrough Artist – Release.

Early life
Odette was born in Bath, England in 1997 and grew up in inner western Sydney, Australia. Her mother is South African and her father is English-born. She began writing music at approximately eight years old, while attending Haberfield Public School.

Musical style and influences
Odette cites Joanna Newsom, Laura Mvula and her grandfather (a jazz pianist) as musical influences, and poets John Keats and Walt Whitman as lyrical influences.

Career

2017–2018: To a Stranger
In 2017, Odette released her debut single, "Watch Me Read You", a piano ballad incorporating spoken word which she wrote in England in 2015. It peaked at No. 14 on the ARIA Hitseekers Singles Chart. 

At the ARIA Music Awards of 2018, Odette was nominated for two awards; Best Adult Contemporary Album and Breakthrough Artist for To a Stranger. Happy Mag's Luke Saunders called the album "a poetic tapestry of melancholy soul and powerful pop ballads." Triple J praised Odette's "canny ability to weave melodic meditations that, like her singing, hover in the space between sensuous composition and spoken-word poetry" throughout the album.

2020–present: Herald

On 20 October 2020, Odette released "Dwell", the second single from her forthcoming second studio album, Herald, released on 5 February 2021.

Discography

Studio albums

Singles

Awards and nominations

ARIA Music Awards
The ARIA Music Awards is an annual awards ceremony that recognises excellence, innovation, and achievement across all genres of Australian music.

! 
|-
| rowspan="2"| 2018
| rowspan="2"| To a Stranger 
| Best Adult Contemporary Album
| 
| rowspan="2"| 
|-
| Breakthrough Artist
| 
|-
| rowspan="2"| 2021
| rowspan="1"| Herald 
| Best Adult Contemporary Album
| 
| rowspan="2"| 
|-
| Eben Ejdne for Herald
| Best Cover Art
| 
|-

Australian Music Prize
The Australian Music Prize (the AMP) is an annual award of $30,000 given to an Australian band or solo artist in recognition of the merit of an album released during the year of award. It commenced in 2005.

|-
! scope="row"| 2021
| Herald
| Australian Music Prize
|

References

Australian musicians
Living people
1997 births